Dame Elizabeth Shân Josephine Legge-Bourke  (née Bailey; born 10 September 1943) is a Welsh landowner who served as the second Lord Lieutenant of Powys.

The only child of Wilfred Bailey, 3rd Baron Glanusk, Legge-Bourke inherited the Glanusk Park estate of some 18,000 acres on his death in 1948. In 1964 she married Captain William Legge-Bourke (1939–2009; son of Major Sir Harry Legge-Bourke, a Conservative MP for the Isle of Ely), and they have three children:
 Tiggy Pettifer (née Legge-Bourke; born 1965), nanny to Princes William and Harry.
 Zara Victoria Gordon-Lennox (née Legge-Bourke; born 1966), first wife of Richard Drax.
 Captain Harry Russell Legge-Bourke (born 1972) an officer in the Welsh Guards, former aide-de-camp to Lord Guthrie of Craigiebank and page of honour to HM the Queen between 1985 and 1987.

In 1998, Legge-Bourke was appointed as Lord Lieutenant of Powys. In 2006 she was the subject of a BBC Wales series entitled The Lady of Glanusk. 

Appointed a Lieutenant of the Royal Victorian Order (LVO) in 1988, in the 2015 New Year Honours Legge-Bourke was promoted to Dame Commander of the Royal Victorian Order (DCVO).

References

External links
Shân Legge-Bourke interview on AP Archive

1943 births
Living people
Dames Commander of the Royal Victorian Order
Lord-Lieutenants of Powys
Daughters of barons
Welsh landowners